Alcithoe jaculoides is a species of large sea snail, a marine gastropod mollusc in the family Volutidae, the volutes. This species is found only along the coast of North Island, New Zealand.

Distribution 
New Zealand Exclusive Economic Zone

References

Volutidae
Gastropods of New Zealand
Gastropods described in 1924